Wacław Korabiewicz (5 May 1903, in St. Petersburg – 15 February 1994, in Warsaw) was a Polish physician and ethnographer. His reputation is that of writer, poet, traveller and collector of ethnographic material.

Early life
He was the son of Antoni Korabiewicz and Stefania née Matusiewicz. He spent his childhood in Kiev and Kharkiv and on the family estate in Lithuania.

In the years 1927–1932 he studied medicine and ethnography at Stefan Batory University in Vilnius. While a student, he was co-founder and member of the Vilnius Academic Vagabonds Club. A fellow student at the time was the writer, Czeslaw Milosz and commented about Korabiewicz's great height that earned him the Sobriquet, Kilometre. He made his début in the journal Reduta (Vilnius 1925), and had poems appear in poetry publications, including STO, Vilnius 1928, A stick in the sky, Vilnius, 1929 and in magazines such as, "Alma Mater Vilnensis".

Career and travels

In 1930, he travelled by canoe across Turkey and Greece. After graduation, he worked as a doctor at the Polish Naval Academy in Gdynia. In the years 1931–1939 he was the ship's doctor on Dar Pomorza. From 1934 onwards, with his first wife, Janina M. Haazówna, he travelled to India. After the outbreak of World War II he was interned in Stockholm with the crew of the Dar Pomorza. Later, he worked on the liner, MS Piłsudski. He next lived in London, where he was a founder of Circle for the Care of Veterans. He moved to Sao Paulo and Rio de Janeiro, where he organized help for former Polish prisoners of war. In 1942, he participated in an expedition into the Brazilian jungle. From 1943 to 1946, he stayed in Africa, as a delegate of the Polish government-in-exile. While in Lusaka, he worked for the Polish Ministry of Social Welfare that had responsibility for Polish ex-prisoners in the camps of Northern Rhodesia. He had a similar role in Dar es Salaam, Tanzania. He worked as a deputy curator of the "King George V Memorial Museum", conducting research into folklore of the British territories in Africa and also in Mozambique. He was also a physician  at a local hospital. In 1954, after sending a number of exhibits to the Polish Museum of Folk Culture in Młociny, he was expelled from Tanganyika and stayed in London. Between 1954 - 1956 he was in Ethiopia, where he worked as a doctor.

In 1958, he returned to Poland. From 1959 to 1961, he went out to Ghana as the head of an epidemiological programme. He returned to Warsaw in 1962. From that time he dedicated himself exclusively to writing. Between 1963 and 1976, he "forwarded" exhibits to the National Museum in Warsaw. He organized exhibitions of their collections of African art, including the exhibition "Masqual - The Cross of Ethiopia", air the National Museum, Warsaw, 1966. He travelled widely in Africa and in the Middle East. He settled in Natolin, a district of Warsaw.

Death

After his death, the casket containing the ashes was buried in the Baltic Sea.

Works
 Kajakiem do minaretów reportaż podróżniczy; Główna Księgarnia Wojskowa 1935; Wiedza Powszechna 1958)
 Mato Grosso. Z notatek wypychacza ptaków reportaż podróżniczy; Horyzont 1948; jako Mato Grosso: Czytelnik 1959, 1968, 1989, seria: „Z żaglem"
 Bajki dla dorosłych poezje; Oficyna Poetów i Malarzy, 1953 
 Kwaheri reportaż podróżniczy; Iskry 1958, 1960, 1965
 Safari Mingi. Wędrówki po Afryce reportaż podróżniczy; Czytelnik 1959, Iskry 1963, 
 Żaglem do jogów reportaż podróżniczy; Ludowa Spółdzielnia Wydawnicza 1960, Sport i Turystyka 1984, 
 Midimo. Romans afrykański powieść; Czytelnik 1961, 
 Eskulap w Etiopii reportaż podróżniczy; Ludowa Spółdzielnia Wydawnicza 1963; wydanie zmienione pt.: Słońce na ambach, Iskry 1970, seria: „Naokoło świata"
 Zwierzaki opowiadania dla dzieci; Nasza Księgarnia 1965, 
 Boa-dusiciel (osobne wydanie jednego z opowiadań tomu Zwierzaki: Ruch 1966)
 Sztuka Afryki w zbiorach polskich fotografie Zdzisław Małek; Wydawnictwo Polonia 1966; in English: African art in Polish collections, Polonia Publishing House 1966; French edition: L'art de l'Afrique noire dans les collections polonais, Polonia 1966)
 Święty krokodyl  - opowiadanie dla dzieci; Ruch 1966
 Do Timbuktu - reportaż podróżniczy; Iskry 1967; seria: „Naokoło świata"
 Kajakiem do Indii nowe opracowanie dwóch wcześniej wydanych książek: Kajakiem do minaretów i Żaglem do jogów; Iskry 1972; seria: „Naokoło świata"
 The Ethiopian cross album; Holy Trinity Cathedral, Addis Abeba, 1973
 Rapsod o głowie hetmana poemat; Wydawnictwo MON 1973 , 
 Złowiłem życie autobiografia; Iskry 1973], 1977; seria: „Łowcy sensacji"
 Śladami amuletu studium; Arkady 1974
 Krzyż koptyjski i jego naśladownictwa: kolekcja Wacława Korabiewicza - Le croix copte et son évolution: collection Wacław Korabiewicz (oprac. katalog wystawy; trans. into French: Zsolt Kiss; Muzeum Narodowe w Warszawie. Galeria Sztuki Faras 1976
 Dobry simba - Reportaże podróżnicze; wybór tekstów z książek: Kwaheri, Midimo, Safari Mingi, Eskulap w Etiopii, Słońce na ambach, Do Timbuktu, Złowiłem życie; Iskry 1979; seria: „Biblioteka Literatury Faktu"
 Gdzie słoń a gdzie Polska pamiętniki; Wydawnictwo MON 1980, ; 1983)
 Wiara leczy. Rzecz o dziwnych lekach, szkice popularnonaukowe; Veritas 1982
 Serce na dłoniach. Opowieść biograficzna o Walerii Sikorzynie Komitet Uczczenia Pamięci Walerii Sikorzyny, Londyn 1984, Wydawnictwo Marek Rożak, 
 Pokusy wspomnienia; Iskry 1986)
 Cuda bez cudu. Rzecz o dziwnych lekach  - Ludowa Spółdzielnia Wydawnicza 1988,)
 Inne drogi Jezusa. O czym milczy Kościół - Kwartet 1992; wydanie pod innym tytułem: Tajemnica młodości i śmierci Jezusa, Przedświt 1992
 Wiersze niemodne poezje; Klucz 1992)
 Z „Daru Pomorza" na ... bezdroża - opowiadania; Wyższa Szkoła Morska 1993)

External links
 History of the Vilnius Academic Vagabonds Club
  in the shadow of the "idea of the Jagiellonian"

1903 births
1994 deaths
20th-century Polish poets
20th-century Polish male writers
20th-century Polish journalists
Recipient of the Meritorious Activist of Culture badge